"Amnesia" is a song by the American rock band Red Sun Rising. It was released on May 25, 2016 on their third album Polyester Zeal as the third single.

Charts

References

2015 songs
2016 singles
Razor & Tie singles
Song recordings produced by Bob Marlette